Arslan is a Turkic masculine given name and surname, used mainly in the Middle East, Central Asia, South Asia, and Western China. It is translated as "fearless", "warrior", "brave", or "lion".  and Aslan/Arsalan are variants of the name.

People

Given name 
 Arslan Ash (born 1996), Pakistani esports player
 Arslan Aydemirov (born 1977), Russian footballer
 Arslan Asad Butt (born 1992), Pakistani actor
 Arslan Ekşi (born 1985), Turkish volleyball player
 Arslan Giray (1692–1768), khan of the Crimean khanate
 Arslan Khalimbekov (born 1967), Russian football manager and former player
 Arslan Khan (disambiguation), multiple people
 Arslan Mataraci Pasha (died 1704), Ottoman governor
 Arslan Mehmed Pasha (Bosnia) (1745–1812), governor of the Ottoman Province of Bosnia
 Arslan Qadir (born 1994), Pakistani field hockey player
 Arslan Seyhanlı (born 1960),  Turkish wrestler
 Arslan Toğuz (1886–1963), police commissioner of the Ottoman Empire, Turkish militia leader and politician
 Uğur Arslan Kuru (born 1986), Turkish footballer
 Didem Arslan Yılmaz (born 1974), Turkish news anchor and TV presenter

Surname
 Adil Arslan (1880–1954), Ottoman politician, writer and poet from Syria
 Ahmet Arslan (disambiguation), multiple people, including:
 Ahmet Arslan (politician) (born 1962), Turkish politician
 Alparslan Arslan (1977–20023), Turkish criminal
 Antonia Arslan (born 1938), Italian writer of Armenian origin
 Aybüke Arslan (born 1994), Turkish women's footballer
 Berkin Kamil Arslan (born 1992), Turkish footballer
 Buse Arslan (born 1992), Turkish actress
 Cengiz Arslan (born 1996), Turkish Greco-Roman wrestler
 Cihat Arslan (born 1970), Turkish footballer and manager
 Emin Arslan (1868–1943), Ottoman civil servant and Lebanese writer
 Ender Arslan (born 1983), Turkish basketball player
 Ensar Arslan (born 2001), German footballer
 Ertuğrul Arslan (born 1980), Turkish footballer
 Faysal Arslan (1941–2009), Lebanese politician
 Firat Arslan (born 1970), German professional boxer of Turkish origin
 Gülcan Arslan (born 1986), Turkish actress
 Hakan Arslan (born 1988), Turkish footballer
 Hakan Arslan (footballer, born 1989), Turkish footballer
 Hamit Arslan (1894–?), Turkish footballer
 Huseyin Arslan, American engineer
 Ilke Arslan, Turkish American microscopist
 Işık Kaan Arslan (born 2001), Turkish footballer
 İhsan Arslan (born 1948), Turkish politician and businessman of Kurdish origin
 Kadir Arslan (born 1977), Turkish volleyball player
 Kamber Arslan (born 1980), Turkish footballer
 Kanbolat Görkem Arslan (born 1980), Turkish actor
 Koray Arslan (born 1983), Turkish footballer
 M Iqbal Arslan, Bangladeshi physician and academic
 Majid Arslan (1908–1983), Lebanese politician
 May Arslan (1928–2013), member of the Lebanese Arslan family
 Murat Arslan, Turkish judge
 Murat Aslan (born 1986), Turkish volleyball player
 Mücahit Arslan, Turkish politician
 Nadia Arslan (1949–2008), Lebanese actress
 Namosh E. Arslan (born 1981), German singer, musician, performance artist, actor and DJ
 Osman Arslan (born 1942), Turkish judge
 Ömer Arslan (born 1993), Turkish footballer
 Qutlu Arslan, 12th-century Georgian politician and statesman
 Rahmi Arslan (1874–1947), Ottoman revolutionary
 Shakib Arslan, (1869–1946), Lebanese politician, writer, poet, historian
 Sibel Arslan (born 1980), Swiss-Turkish politician and lawyer
 Talal Arslan (born 1963), Lebanese politician
 Thomas Arslan (born 1970), German-Turkish film director
 Tolgay Arslan (born 1990), German-Turkish footballer
 Volkan Arslan (born 1978), Turkish footballer
 Yasin Arslan (born 1978), Turkish weightlifter
 Yiğit Arslan (born 1996), Turkish basketball player
 Yılmaz Arslan (born 1968), German film director of Kurdish origin
 Zeina Talal Arslan, Lebanese social activist
 Zühtü Arslan (born 1964), Turkish judge

Title 
 Bazir Arslan Khan, Khagan of Karakhanids
 Ali Arslan Khan (died 998), Karakhanid ruler
 Arslan Isra'il (died 1032), Turkish chieftain
 Alp Arslan al-Akhras (died 1114), Seljuk sultan of Aleppo
 Ali ibn Il-Arslan, Turkish statesmen in the Ghaznavid empire
 Togan Arslan (died 1137), Bey of Dilmaç
 Alp Arslan ibn Mahmud (died 1146), ruler of Mosul
 Il-Arslan (died 1172), Kharazm Shah
 Alp Arslan (1029–1072), second sultan of the Seljuk dynasty
 Khadija Arslan Khatun, Seljuk princess
 Arslan ibn Mas'ud (died 1118), Sultan of the Ghaznavid Empire
 Arslan Khan (prince), Prince of the Karluks
 Arslan Shah I (died 1142), Sultan of Kerman 
 Kara Arslan (died 1174), member of the Artuqid dynasty
 Qizil Arslan (died 1191)) Atabeg of the Eldiguzids
 Kilij Arslan I (1079–1107), Sultan of Seljuk Sultanate of Rûm, first sultan in Konya
 Kilij Arslan II (died 1192), Sultan of Seljuk Sultanate of Rûm
 Kilij Arslan III (died 1205), Sultan of Seljuk Sultanate of Rûm
 Kilij Arslan IV (died 1265), Sultan of Seljuk Sultanate of Rûm
 Al-Nasir Kilij Arslan (died 1229), Emir of Hama
 Nur al-Din Arslan Shah I (died 1211), Zengid Emir of Mossul
 Melik Arslan Bey (died 1466), seventh bey of the Beylik of Dulkadir

See also
 Aslan (disambiguation)
 Arslanović
 Lions in Islam
 Ruslan (given name)

References

Sources 
 
 
 
 
 
 
 
 
 
 
 
 

Turkish-language surnames
Turkish masculine given names
Persian masculine given names
Iranian masculine given names
Bashkir-language masculine given names
Tatar-language masculine given names
Tatar-language surnames
Bashkir-language surnames